John Paul Kostecki (born July 7, 1964) is an American competitive sailor of Polish descent. He was born in Pittsburgh, Pennsylvania. He started his sailing career in the San Francisco Bay, California.

Events

World Championships
Kostecki won a number of world champion titles in different sailing classes.

Olympics
At the 1988 Summer Olympics in Busan, South Korea, he finished in 2nd place in the Soling class along with his partners William Baylis and Robert Billingham.

Volvo Ocean Race
He also sailed the Whitbread Round the World Race in 1997/1998.

In the 2001–02 Volvo Ocean Race he led Illbruck Challenge that was based in Leverkusen to an overwhelming victory in the arguably toughest sailing race around the world. Of notable interest was the fact that Illbruck set the world 24 hours speed record for monohulls. The record of 484 nautical miles was completed at 20:02 on April 30 during Leg 7 of the Volvo Ocean Race and was confirmed by the World Sailing Speed Record Council. This sparked an unprecedented sailing boom in Germany that led to thousands of sailing fans and Illbruck supporters awaiting Kostecki and his crew finishing their last leg from Gothenburg to Kiel.

He did the 2005–06 Volvo Ocean Race with Ericsson. He was also designated skipper for Ericsson’s in the next Race (2008/2009) but resigned from his position in August 2007 for family reasons

America's Cup
He sailed with America3 at the 1992 America's Cup.

After a short employment with the BMW Oracle America’s Cup Team in the early 2000s he left for the 2005 VOE.

In 2008, the then three times America’s Cup winner Russell Coutts, who had just recently been appointed CEO of Larry Ellison's America’s Cup Team BMW Oracle Racing, hired Kostecki for his afterguard. The next America’s cup match took place between the defender, the Swiss team Alinghi, and BMW Oracle, in Valencia (Spain) in February 2010. With Kostecki as tactician, the American team won both races against the defender and thus brought back the oldest trophy in sports history to the United States after 15 years.

Other
In 1997, he won  the One Design 48 Championship, and the Malaysia Challenge Grand Prix. Kostecki became very popular in Europe as skipper and helmsman of the German yachts all called "Pinta" owned by the Illibruck family.

Awards
In 1988, he was then named United States Rolex Yachtsman of the Year

In 2002, Kostecki was named United States Rolex Yachtsman of the Year for the second time 

In 2002 he was shortlisted for the World Sailing - World Sailor of the Year Awards.

2012 US Sailing Hall of Fame Inductee

References

External links
 
 
 

Living people
1964 births
1992 America's Cup sailors
1995 America's Cup sailors
2000 America's Cup sailors
2010 America's Cup sailors
2013 America's Cup sailors
6 Metre class world champions
American male sailors (sport)
Australian Champions Soling
Farr 40 class world champions
J/24 class world champions
J/70 class world champions
Medalists at the 1988 Summer Olympics
Melges 20 class world champions
North American Champions Soling
Olympic silver medalists for the United States in sailing
Oracle Racing sailors
RC44 class world champions
Sailors at the 1988 Summer Olympics – Soling
Sportspeople from Pittsburgh
Sunfish class world champions
TP52 class world champions
US Sailor of the Year
Volvo Ocean Race sailors
World champions in sailing for the United States
Soling class world champions